720p (1280×720 px; also called HD ready, standard HD or just HD) is a progressive HDTV signal format with 720 horizontal lines/1280 columns and an aspect ratio (AR) of 16:9, normally known as widescreen HDTV (1.78:1). All major HDTV broadcasting standards (such as SMPTE 292M) include a 720p format, which has a resolution of 1280×720; however, there are other formats, including HDV Playback and AVCHD for camcorders, that use 720p images with the standard HDTV resolution. The frame rate is standards-dependent, and for conventional broadcasting appears in 50 progressive frames per second in former PAL/SECAM countries (Europe, Australia, others), and 59.94 frames per second in former NTSC countries (North America, Japan, Brazil, others).

The number 720 stands for the 720 horizontal scan lines of image display resolution (also known as 720 pixels of vertical resolution).  The p stands for progressive scan, i.e. non-interlaced. When broadcast at 60 frames per second, 720p features the highest temporal resolution possible under the ATSC and DVB standards. The term assumes a widescreen aspect ratio of 16:9, thus implying a resolution of 1280×720 px (0.9 megapixels).

720i (720 lines interlaced) is an erroneous term found in numerous sources and publications. Typically, it is a typographical error in which the author is referring to the 720p HDTV format. However, in some cases it is incorrectly presented as an actual alternative format to 720p. No proposed or existing broadcast standard permits 720 interlaced lines in a video frame at any frame rate.

Comparison with 1080i 
Progressive scanning reduces the need to prevent flicker by anti-aliasing single high contrast horizontal lines. It is also easier to perform high-quality 50<-->60 Hz conversion and slow-motion clips with progressive video.

A 720p60 (720p at 59.94 Hz) video has advantage over 480i and 1080i60 (29.97/30 frame/s, 59.94/60 Hz) in that it comparably reduces the number of 3:2 artifacts introduced during transfer from 24 frame/s film. However, 576i and 1080i50 (25 frame/s, 50 Hz), which are common in Europe, generally do not suffer from pull down artifacts as film frames are simply played at 25 frames and the audio pitch corrected by 25/24. As a result, 720p60 is used for U.S. broadcasts while European HD broadcasts often use 1080i50 24* frame, with a horizontal resolution of 1920 or 1440 depending on bandwidth constraints. However, some European broadcasters do use the 720p50 format, such as German broadcasters ARD and ZDF, and the Norwegian Broadcasting Corporation (NRK). Arte, a dual-language French-German channel produced in collaboration by ARD, ZDF and France Télévisions, broadcasts in German at 720p50 but in French at 1080i50.  The Flemish Broadcasting Company (VRT) in Belgium was using 720p50, but switched to 1080i50 a few years ago.

Resolutions

Notes

See also 

 4K, 4320p, 2160p, 1080p, 1080i,  576p, 576i, 480p, 480i, 360p, 240p
 High-definition television (HDTV)
 Image resolution
 List of common resolutions
 Low-definition television (LDTV)
 Plasma display

References

External links
 EBU Technical paper on HDTV formats

Television terminology
Video formats